Monument of Jews and Poles Common Martyrdom in Warsaw commemorates the martyrdom and death of seven thousand Jews and Poles who were murdered in mass executions in this place in 1940-1943 during the German occupation of Poland in World War II.

External links 

History of Warsaw
Warsaw Ghetto
Monuments and memorials in Warsaw
Mausoleums in Poland
1989 sculptures
1989 establishments in Poland
Holocaust memorials in Poland